Richard Rafael Sánchez Guerrero (born 29 March 1996) is a Paraguayan professional footballer who plays as a midfielder for Liga MX club América and the Paraguay national team.

Club career
Richard has played for Olimpia and Club América.

International career
He was called up to the senior Paraguay squad in March 2018 for a match against USA.

Sánchez made his senior debut for Paraguay on June 5, 2019 in a friendly against Honduras in Ciudad del Este, Paraguay. And he scored his first goal for the National Team in the 2019 Copa America, in a 1–1 tie with Argentina on June 19, 2019.

International goals
Scores and results list Paraguay's goal tally first.

Honours
Individual
 CONCACAF Champions League Team of the Tournament: 2021

References

1996 births
Living people
Paraguayan footballers
Paraguayan Primera División players
Liga MX players
Club Olimpia footballers
River Plate (Asunción) footballers
Club América footballers
Association football midfielders
2019 Copa América players
Paraguay international footballers
Paraguayan expatriate footballers
Expatriate footballers in Mexico